The 2006 Buffalo Bulls football team represented the University at Buffalo in the 2006 NCAA Division I FBS football season. The Bulls offense scored 220 points while the defense allowed 431 points. Turner Gill was in his first season as the Bulls head coach.

Schedule

Roster

Game summaries
Miami (Ohio)

Due to a snow storm that hit the area, the game was played on Sunday instead of Saturday.

References

Buffalo
Buffalo Bulls football seasons
Buffalo Bulls football